Chelsea TV was a British subscription based sports television channel, dedicated to the fans of the English Premier League football club, Chelsea. The channel first launched in August 2001 on Sky Digital. The station was registered with Ofcom as Chelsea Digital Media Ltd. It was broadcast daily from 10:00am to midnight. Until it was removed in early 2010, it used to be broadcast in Channel 427 on UPC Ireland.

The channel closed on 30 June 2019, and was moved to an online only service.

Programming
Chelsea TV was broadcast live everyday from 10am to midnight from the studios at Stamford Bridge.

Top shows included Friday Night Live which broadcast each Friday with former players Kerry Dixon and Jason Cundy. Friday Night Live allowed fans to call in and share their views on all things Chelsea. The show regularly had first team players join the phone-in, the 2009–10 season saw Didier Drogba, Frank Lampard, Mikel, Malouda and Kalou all answer the fans' questions.

Live build-up to midweek games was on Matchnight Live which broadcast from 6pm and had previews to the game, team news first and analysis. Every midweek game followed with a live fans' phone-in from 10pm. Chelsea TV was the only place to watch the Chelsea Reserves and Academy Teams in action. Reserves Live had full coverage of every Reserve game some of which took place at Griffin Park in the London Borough of Hounslow, the home ground of Brentford.

Blues News was the daily news programme with headlines at 1pm and 5pm followed by a full news bulletin at 6.30 pm and 10 pm. Paper View was broadcast live from the studios every Thursday with the finest Fleet Street reporters discussing the news surrounding the club. Inside Cobham showed the week's training sessions and exclusive players interviews from the Chelsea's training ground in Cobham, Surrey. Exclusive interviews from the first team players and management was seen on The Big Interview. Many new shows and series were shown throughout the year. In 2009 a new fans' post-match phone-in was introduced called "Extra time at the Bridge" this allowed fans' to share their views after every weekend home game by calling the studio or emailing Chelsea TV.

Presenters
The channel has various presenters, including former players Jason Cundy, Tommy Langley, Scott Minto and Kerry Dixon. Regular hosts include Gigi Salmon, Alison Bender, Ben Andrews, Lee Parker as well as Neil Barnett.

Chelsea matches are mainly commentated by Trevor Harris, Ben Andrews (who hosted the 2007 League Cup Final, 2007 FA Cup Final and 2008 UEFA Champions League Final), Mark Tompkins, Dan Roebuck and Gary Taphouse. Cundy is often co-commentator and is highly enthusiastic when Chelsea score in big games.

Gigi Salmon currently presents many shows on the channel and has been a Chelsea TV station presenter since the channel was launched in August 2001. Some of the programmes she presents include Blues News and Matchnight Live and Paperview. Neil Barnett has been presenting since the launch of the channel in August 2001. He began working for The Blues in the 1980s writing articles for the club's magazine.

Chelsea TV Online
On 1 July 2019, Chelsea TV Online launched as a new way to view Chelsea TV via a PC or Mac:

Chelsea TV Online is powered by the club's internet partner Perform, with content from the Sky channel, Chelsea TV and includes exclusive interviews, live press conferences, Bridge Kids and many behind the scenes features, exclusive to Chelsea TV.

References

External links
Official site
Chelsea TV Online
Chelsea TV Live
Chelsea TV listings The Guardian

Chelsea F.C.
Football club television channels in the United Kingdom
Television channels in the United Kingdom
2001 establishments in the United Kingdom
Television channels and stations established in 2001
Premier League on television